South Carolina Highway 99 (SC 99) is a  state highway in the U.S. state of South Carolina. The highway connects Great Falls with rural areas of Chester County.

Route description
SC 99 begins at an intersection with U.S. Route 21 (US 21) and SC 200 (Pendergrass Boulevard) in Great Falls within Chester County. It travels to the northwest. On the edge of the city limits of the town is an intersection with SC 97 (Francis Avenue). They have a very brief concurrency. SC 99 travels in a north-northwesterly direction and passes Howze Cemetery. The highway continues traveling through rural areas and meets its northern terminus, an intersection with SC 9 (Lancaster Highway).

Major intersections

See also

References

External links

SC 99 at Virginia Highways' South Carolina Highways Annex

099
Transportation in Chester County, South Carolina